The Corona Wind Projects is a collection of 2.2-gigawatt wind farms being developed by Pattern Energy in New Mexico near Corona, New Mexico in Lincoln County, Guadalupe County and Torrance County, New Mexico. It received unanimous approval October 5, 2018 by the New Mexico Public Regulation Commission (PRC). However, the PRC rejected and requested that SunZia resubmit a more detailed application to build a 500-mile-long transmission line to carry the power to California.

If built, the project would include 950 wind turbines. As an example of the available wind energy in New Mexico, the Red Cloud wind farm has a capacity factor of 46%.

Pattern Energy previously purchased the rights to the Mesa Canyons Wind Farm from Clean Line Energy Partners in May 2018.  The Mesa Canyons Wind Farm is a 1 GW wind farm just north of Corona.  This combined with the Corona Wind Project gives the 3 GW of energy that is projected to be exported to the west via the SunZia power line.

Pattern Energy have already sold 200 MW of the 2.2 GW capacity via 15-year Power Purchase Agreements to Silicon Valley Clean Energy (SVCE) and Monterey Bay Community Power (MBCP). Pattern Energy bought the 3 GW SunZia transmission project in July 2022.

Notes and references

Wind farms in New Mexico